Oleksandr Vasylyovych Butko (born 7 October 1957) is a Ukrainian journalist, editor and TV manager. He is the CEO of the TV channel Tonis.

Biography

Early years. Education 

Oleksandr Butko was born October 7, 1957, in Kovali (Chornukhy Raion, Poltava Oblast, Ukrainian SSR). In 1980 he graduated from the faculty of journalism at Kyiv State University.

Career 

1980–1992 — editor, senior editor, chairman of the Ukrainian Radio sector in Statetvradio of Ukrainian SSR
1992–1995 — editor of mass entertainment programs in Ukrtvradiocompany
1995–1997 — editor-in-chief of creative-production association "Youth" in National Television Company of Ukraine, CEO of creative-production association "New Generation"
1997–2001 — CEO of creative-production association "Ukrainian TV News", first vice-president of the National Television Company of Ukraine
2001–2002 — deputy editor-in-chief of "President" magazine
2002–2003 — project coordinator on "Gravis" (TV channel)
2003–2003 — editor on "Studio Plus" (TV channel)
2003–2005 — vice-president of the National Radio Company of Ukraine, member of the National Council of Ukraine on Television and Radio
Since September 7, 2011 — CEO in "Tonis" (TV channel)
Member of the National Union of Journalists of Ukraine since (1997).

See also 

Tonis (TV channel)

Ukrainian journalists
Ukrainian editors
Ukrainian television managers
Living people
1957 births
Ukrainian chief executives
People from Poltava Oblast
Taras Shevchenko National University of Kyiv alumni